Vellivayal is a village in the Pattukkottai taluk of Thanjavur district, Tamil Nadu, India.

Demographics 

As per the 2001 census, Vellivayal had a total population of 612 with 304 males and 308 females. The sex ratio was 1013. The literacy rate was 72.9.

References 

 

Villages in Thanjavur district